Florida's 12th House District elects one member of the Florida House of Representatives. The district is represented by Clay Yarborough. This district is located in Northeast Florida, and encompasses part of the First Coast, as well as the eastern part of the Jacksonville metropolitan area. The district also contains the eastern half of the Arlington and the part of the Southside neighborhoods of Jacksonville. The district covers part of eastern Duval County. The district is located entirely within Jacksonville, though it only contains part of the city. As of the 2010 Census, the district's population is 156,867.

This district contains the University of North Florida, located in the Southside neighborhood of Jacksonville.

Representatives from 1967 to the present

See also 

 Florida's 4th Senate district
 Florida's 6th Senate district
 Florida's 4th congressional district
 Florida's 5th congressional district

References 

12
Duval County, Florida
Jacksonville, Florida